Bracovirus is a genus of viruses, in the family Polydnaviridae. Bracoviruses are an ancient symbiotic virus contained in parasitic braconid wasps that evolved off of the nudivirus about 190 million years ago and has been evolving at least 100 million years. It is one of two genera belonging to the Polydnaviridae family, Ichnovirus being the other genus. There are 32 species in this genus.

Symbiosis
Parasitoid wasps in the subfamilies Microgastrinae, Miracinae, Cheloninae, Cardiochilinae, Khoikhoiinae, and Mendesellinae are the natural hosts for Bracoviruses, though the virus does not cause disease in these wasps. Instead, the wasps are themselves parasites of lepidoptera. The wasp injects one or more eggs into its lepidoptera host along with a quantity of virus. The virus does not replicate inside the wasp's host, but expression of viral genes prevents its immune system from killing the wasp's egg and causes other physiological alterations that ultimately cause the parasitized host to die. Studies conducted on Cotesia congregata have shown that male wasps do contain proviral sequences of DNA, but the females are the ones responsible for the amplification of the viral DNA.

Taxonomy
The genus contains the following 32 species:

Apanteles crassicornis bracovirus
Apanteles fumiferanae bracovirus
Ascogaster argentifrons bracovirus
Ascogaster quadridentata bracovirus
Cardiochiles nigriceps bracovirus
Chelonus altitudinis bracovirus
Chelonus blackburni bracovirus
Chelonus inanitus bracovirus
Chelonus insularis bracovirus
Chelonus near curvimaculatus bracovirus
Chelonus texanus bracovirus
Cotesia congregata bracovirus
Cotesia flavipes bracovirus
Cotesia glomerata bracovirus
Cotesia hyphantriae bracovirus
Cotesia kariyai bracovirus
Cotesia marginiventris bracovirus
Cotesia melanoscela bracovirus
Cotesia rubecula bracovirus
Cotesia schaeferi bracovirus
Diolcogaster facetosa bracovirus
Glyptapanteles flavicoxis bracovirus
Glyptapanteles indiensis bracovirus
Glyptapanteles liparidis bracovirus
Hypomicrogaster canadensis bracovirus
Hypomicrogaster ectdytolophae bracovirus
Microplitis croceipes bracovirus
Microplitis demolitor bracovirus
Phanerotoma flavitestacea bracovirus
Pholetesor ornigis bracovirus
Protapanteles paleacritae bracovirus
Tranosema rostrale bracovirus

Structure
Viruses in Bracovirus are enveloped, with prolate ellipsoid and cylindrical geometries. Genomes are circular and segmented, around 2.0-31kb in length. The genome of the virus is enveloped with 35 double stranded DNA (dsDNA) all of which are circular.

Life cycle
Viral replication is nuclear. DNA-templated transcription is the method of transcription. The virus exits the host cell by nuclear pore export. Transmission routes are parental.

The replication of the Bracoviriform occurs within the ovaries of a parasitic  wasps in calyx cells and is maintained by vertical transmission and to go into further detail the packaged genome of dsDNA is replicated inside of the wasp ovaries by development of the sequences of the virus from proviral segments in the tandem arrays in the wasp genome.  The development of the sequences of Bracoviriform shows head-to-head and tail-to-tail sequences, which is unexpected, given that it has evolved from the nudivirus   The research conducted on Cortesia congregata shows that the viral genome contains one to three proviral segments.

The virus like particle is transmitted into a lepidopteran host (a caterpillar) and infects and manipulates the physiology of the caterpillar so that it can be used as a living incubator for wasp larvae.  When this happens the virus disrupts the caterpillar's immune system causing paralysis and inhibiting the pupating of the host. The arresting of the host increases the chance of success of the wasp larva developing successfully.

References

External links
 Viralzone: Bracovirus
 ICTV

Polydnaviridae
Virus genera